Birkelandodden is the northern point of the island Akseløya between Van Mijenfjorden and Bellsund at Spitsbergen, Svalbard. The point is named after Kristian Birkeland. A light has been set up to help navigation through Akselsundet, the main entrance to Van Mijenfjorden.

References

Headlands of Svalbard
Akseløya